Cobra Starship was an American dance-pop band founded in 2005 by Gabe Saporta (ex-Midtown), and headquartered in New York City. He recorded the first album as a solo project, While the City Sleeps, We Rule the Streets.  Saporta later enlisted guitarist Ryland Blackinton, bassist Alex Suarez, drummer Nate Novarro, and keytarist Victoria Asher, all of whom provide backing vocals.

Over ten years, Cobra Starship produced four albums and two Billboard Hot 100 top 10 singles. The group released its debut album, While the City Sleeps, We Rule the Streets, in 2006, which contained the single "Snakes on a Plane (Bring It)". The band released its second album, ¡Viva La Cobra!, on October 23, 2007. Their third album, Hot Mess, was released on August 11, 2009. Their fourth and final album, Night Shades, was released on August 30, 2011, in the US and October 28, 2011, in the UK.

Cobra Starship officially announced its dissolution on November 10, 2015.

History

Formation and While the City Sleeps, We Rule the Streets (2005–2007)
Cobra Starship was formed in 2005, after Midtown bassist Gabe Saporta took a trip to Arizona. During this time, Saporta went on a "vision quest" in the desert, spending time with Native American tribes and smoking peyote. He began to create his vision for a new band, a melodic style of music heavily influenced by synthpop and hip-hop. Upon returning home, Saporta rented a house in the Catskill Mountains and began writing what would become the band's debut album, While the City Sleeps, We Rule the Streets. He posted "Hollaback Boy", a parody response to Gwen Stefani's "Hollaback Girl", on Myspace. The song gained Saporta notoriety on the internet, and he eventually signed to Decaydance Records, the label of his good friend, Fall Out Boy bassist Pete Wentz.

Midtown's management company soon set Saporta up with an opportunity to record a song for the soundtrack to the 2006 Snakes on a Plane. Along with members of The Academy Is..., Gym Class Heroes, and The Sounds, Saporta recorded "Snakes on a Plane (Bring It)", which became a minor hit. During the recording of While the City Sleeps, We Rule the Streets, Saporta began recruiting new members to complete the group's lineup. He first enlisted drummer Nate Novarro, whom he met on tour while Novarro sold merchandise for fellow touring act Hidden in Plain View. After seeing Saporta in Entertainment Weekly, guitarist Ryland Blackinton and bassist Alex Suarez emailed Saporta, asking to join the group. (Blackinton and Suarez lived near each other in Brooklyn; coincidentally, Suarez lived in the same apartment building as Midtown drummer Rob Hitt.) The lineup was completed by Elisa Schwartz, who is credited as playing keytar on While the City Sleeps, We Rule the Streets; Victoria Asher joined the band as its keytarist later. While the City Sleeps, We Rule the Streets was released October 10, 2006. It featured the single "Snakes on a Plane (Bring It)"; the song's music video had been featured during the closing credits of the film Snakes on a Plane earlier that summer. In October 2006, they supported Thirty Seconds to Mars on their Welcome to the Universe Tour.

¡Viva la Cobra! (2007–2008)

With the group's lineup now solidified, Cobra Starship began touring across the United States. While on the 2007 Honda Civic Tour, the group began writing music together for the first time. The members recorded their individual parts on their laptops in the band's bus. By the time Cobra Starship entered the studio to work on a new album, much of the material was already written. Recorded in twenty days at Mission Sound Studios in Brooklyn, New York, ¡Viva la Cobra! was released on October 23, 2007. It was produced by Patrick Stump, who was also credited as singing some backup vocals. The album has been described as "11 tracks of unabashed party jams, full of big hooky electropop, super-produced guitar crunch and the occasional T-Pain-style vocoder thrown in for good measure."

The album was toured heavily worldwide. Cobra headlined the Really Really Ridiculously Good Looking Tour, with guests Metro Station, The Cab, and We The Kings, from January to March 2008. They also played on Warped Tour 2008 and headlined the SassyBack tour, which toured from October 7 through November 30, 2008, with guests Forever the Sickest Kids, Hit the Lights, and Sing It Loud.

The album art for the ¡Viva la Cobra! album was used to promote the fourth-generation Apple iPod Nano in purple.

Hot Mess (2009–2010)
Following the success of Katy Perry's "I Kissed a Girl", Cobra Starship recorded their own cover version, "I Kissed a Boy", in summer 2008. The song was released on August 25, 2008, on Fall Out Boy's Citizens For Our Betterment mixtape Welcome To The New Administration. Cobra Starship is one of nine artists who participated in thetruth.com’s Remix Project, where they remixed the Sunny Side song "Magical Amount".

Cobra Starship also began the Believers Never Die Tour Part Deux tour in the beginning of April 2009, opening for Fall Out Boy, alongside All Time Low, Metro Station, and Hey Monday. They spent time performing many shows in the US, mostly all in April and the beginning of May 2009; however, they also played a few shows in the UK at the end of May 2009, supported by Sing It Loud, Cash Cash, and UK band Mimi Soya.

In 2009, the band went to a cabin in Pennsylvania in an attempt to produce new material. They broadcast live throughout their stay on the live camera feed site Stickam, thus creating the Shelf Kids, an unofficial Cobra Starship fan club. After their stay, a new album was announced with a tentative release in the summer. The band worked with Kara DioGuardi, Kevin Rudolf, S*A*M and Sluggo, and songwriters Benny Blanco and Patrick Stump on Hot Mess. Gossip Girl star Leighton Meester is featured on the song "Good Girls Go Bad", which was produced by Kevin Rudolf and co-written by Rudolf and Kara DioGuardi. The song was the album's first single, and was added on iTunes on May 11, 2009, and made available to listen to on the band's official MySpace page. Other songs include "Pete Wentz Is the Only Reason We're Famous", which was released on their YouTube channel and Vevo page. On May 8, the album title was confirmed as Hot Mess, with a release date of August 11. It debuted on the US Billboard 200 at number four, becoming the band's highest-charting album. Guitarist Ryland Blackinton said of Hot Mess, "We just wanted to make music that was fun and kinda make people just forget about whatever shitty problem they might be having during the week."

The band began their Hot Mess Across the US Tour to promote the new album on August 3, 2009. The tour had 21 stops and featured guests such as Friday Night Boys and DJ Skeet Skeet. After Plastiscines dropped off the tour, Cobra Starship listed a number of candidate bands for the fans to vote for online in a blog; The Audition won. On their official video podcast CobraCam.tv, the band released humorous tentative titles for the album (parodying several other notable albums): Griller, Tha Ryland III, and variations of their ¡Viva La Cobra! album.

Cobra Starship played at a September 11, 2009 MTV Video Music Awards weekend competition and pre-party at The Fillmore at Irving Plaza. The competition was for MTV's "VMA Best Breakout New York City Artist Award", and took place before the MTV Video Music Awards performers and in between performances from MTV Video Music Awards artists.

Cobra Starship appeared at Los Premios MTV Latinoamérica 2009, along with Mexican star Paulina Rubio, performing "Good Girls Go Bad" and "Ni Rosas Ni Juguetes". Cobra Starship and Paulina won an MTV Award for "Best Performance", for "Good Girls Go Bad" and "Ni Rosas Ni Juguetes", voted by the public, beating other artists such as Shakira, Nelly Furtado, and Wisin & Yandel.

At the People’s Choice Awards on January 6, 2010, Cobra Starship performed live with former Pussycat Dolls frontwoman Nicole Scherzinger filling in for Leighton Meester. The performance opened with a taste of their single “Hot Mess.” The band then brought Nicole out for a bridge to a sizzling version of “Good Girls Go Bad.”  However, the original track of the latter number lost out on the award for Favorite Music Collaboration to Jay-Z, Rihanna, and Kanye West‘s “Run This Town."

On February 4, 2010, Cobra Starship embarked on their first-ever European tour, Hot Mess Across the EU-Niverse, which included the UK, Ireland, Germany, France, and the Netherlands. When the tour ended on February 21, the band then traveled to Japan for a few shows, and then onto Australia and New Zealand for the Wet Hot Australian Summer Tour. The group also toured in Germany with I Heart Sharks and One Night Stand!. On February 5, 2010, it was announced that Cobra Starship and 3OH!3 would be embarking on a co-headlining tour, the Too Fast for Love Tour, with opening acts Travis McCoy, The Lazarus Project, and I Fight Dragons. The tour ran from April 28 to June 13, 2010.

In late 2010, the band collaborated with British singer Alexandra Burke on the song "What Happens on the Dancefloor", which was included on the deluxe edition of her debut album Overcome.

Night Shades, "Never Been in Love", and disbandment (2011–2015)
Cobra Starship canceled their 2011 Australian tour to finish up their fourth album, which they were working on with Ryan Tedder and Kara DioGuardi. Gabe Saporta released a song off of the album, "Don't Blame the World, It's the DJ's Fault", on his Tumblr. A video was released of an eggplant with sunglasses and headphones getting made into eggplant Parmesan, supposed to represent the album title. Saporta later announced via Twitter that the new album will be called Night Shades. The first single, "You Make Me Feel...", was released on May 10, 2011. The song was written by written by Steve Mac and Ina Wroldsen, and features American singer/songwriter and rapper Sabi. The music video premiered on MTV on June 28, 2011.

The band's official Twitter and Tumblr announced that the album would be out on August 30, 2011.

The group released iTunes Session – EP on August 23, 2011, containing four acoustic songs and an alternative version of "Fold Your Hands Child".

In promotion of the album, the band performed "You Make Me Feel..." on the MTV Video Music Awards pre-show with Sabi on August 28, 2011.

Night Shades was released on August 29, 2011, with the lead single "You Make Me Feel..." and three promotional singles. The first promotional single, "#1Nite (One Night)" was released on July 26, 2011, while the second, "Fool Like Me" (featuring the Plastiscines) was released on August 9, 2011; the third and final promotional single, "Middle Finger" (featuring Mac Miller) was released on August 23, 2011. Cobra Starship also performed "You Make Me Feel..." in the fall of 2011 on Dancing with the Stars.

Cobra Starship contributed a cover of Buddy Holly's "Peggy Sue" to the Buddy Holly tribute album, Listen to Me: Buddy Holly (2011).

On September 9, 2011, Cobra Starship headlined the Fueled by Ramen 15th Anniversary show in New York's Terminal 5, with VersaEmerge, The Academy Is..., and A Rocket to the Moon supporting. In March 2012, Cobra Starship was featured in the Australian touring rock festival Soundwave.

On April 19, 2014, after nearly three years of no announcements of new material, Cobra Starship confirmed that they were working on a new single. Their single "Never Been in Love", featuring Icona Pop, was released on August 25, 2014.

On October 21, 2014, both Suarez and Blackinton left the band to pursue their own separate careers. They have since been replaced by Eric Halvorsen, formerly of A Rocket to the Moon, and Andy Barr. The band played their first show with their current line-up, a Halloween party, on October 30, 2014 at Saints and Sinner. The band also played on Jimmy Kimmel Live! on November 6, 2014.

On November 10, 2015, it was announced in a blog post on the band's website that they had broken up.

Post-disbandment and brief reunion (2015–present)
In November 2015, Saporta announced on his Beats1 Radio show that he would no longer be performing or putting out new music. He and business associate Mike Carden announced the formation of a talent management firm, T∆G // The Artist Group, expected to commence operations in the first quarter of 2016. Saporta explained that he now wanted to work behind the scenes and help younger artists see their dreams come true.

In October 2016, guitarist Andy Barr began touring with rock band America; Barr toured with them until 2018.

In October 2021, Cobra Starship released a new song, "Beautiful Life", through Fueled By Ramen. In December 2021, they released another song, "Party With You". Both songs received accompanying videos and were previously unreleased b-sides from "Hot Mess". The songs, called Tracks To The Future, were released as part of a promotional campaign for Fueled By Ramen's 25th anniversary and the limited edition re-issue of "Hot Mess" on vinyl. "Party With You" also received a Hannukah themed parody version, "Party With Jews", before its official release. 2021 promotions also included Cobrakkah, a multi-day event in the lead-up to the release of "Party With You". The band still has no plans for reuniting.

Band members
Final lineup
 Gabe Saporta – lead vocals (2005–2015), bass guitar (2014)
 Nate Novarro – drums, backing vocals (2005–2015)
 Victoria Asher – keytar, keyboards, backing vocals (2007–2015)
 Eric Halvorsen – bass guitar, backing vocals (2014–2015)
 Andy Barr – guitar, backing vocals (2014–2015)

Former members
 Elisa Schwartz – keytar, backing vocals (2005–2007)
 Ryland Blackinton – guitar, backing vocals, synthesizer (2005–2014)
 Alex Suarez – bass guitar, backing vocals, synth bass (2005–2014)

Timeline

Discography

 While the City Sleeps, We Rule the Streets (2006)
 ¡Viva la Cobra! (2007)
 Hot Mess (2009)
 Night Shades (2011)

Album appearances

References

External links
 Official website
 Spanish website

American pop music groups
Crush Management artists
Decaydance Records artists
Fueled by Ramen artists
Musical groups established in 2005
Musical groups disestablished in 2015
Musical quintets
Alternative rock groups from New York (state)